Kashar railway station served the municipality of Kashar in Albania.

The branch from Vora to Tirana was closed in 2013 and passenger workings were replaced by a bus service. In 2015, the bus journey was shortened when Kashar station re-opened with the benefit of a refurbishment, allowing travelers to journey to at least the outskirts of Tirana. The new service was inaugurated on 26 May by Ilir Meta (then Parliamentary Speaker) and Minister of Transport and Infrastructure Edmond Haxhinasto. Despite the optimism which accompanied the refurbishment and reopening of Kashar station, Tirana's mayor, Lulzim Basha criticised the delay in the reopening of the remainder of the line to Tirana, as Kashar is still ten kilometers away from the city centre, with the distance and the slow operating speeds meaning that the service was underused. It closed completely in 2018 and the tracks have been removed

References

Railway stations in Albania
Railway stations opened in 1949
Railway stations opened in 2015